The 1886 Dunedin Central by-election was a by-election held on 19 October 1886 in the  electorate during the 9th New Zealand Parliament.

The by-election was caused by the death on 1 September of the incumbent MP James Benn Bradshaw. The by-election was won by Thomas Bracken.

William Hutchison who was interested in standing in both Wellington and Dunedin seats, and who had represented  in parliament was a controversial candidate. There were suggestions that Mr Bracken had agreed to stand down.

Results
The following table gives the election result:

References

Dunedin Central 1886
1886 elections in New Zealand
Politics of Otago
October 1886 events